Strong Black Woman is the fourth stand-up comedy special by stand-up comedian Kathy Griffin on Bravo and her sixth overall.

Track listing

Personnel

Technical and production
Cori Abraham - executive producer
Frances Berwick - executive producer
Tom Bull - supervising producer
Scott Butler - producer
Sandy Chanley - executive producer
Mark Hansson - line producer
Amy Introcaso - executive producer (as Amy Introcaso-Davis)
Kelly Luegenbiehl -  supervising producer
Keith Truesdell - producer
Eban Schletter - music producer
Joshua Harman - film editor
Rich Parry - film editor
Mark Hoffman - production design
Greg Bell - production associate
Luis Bonachea - production associate
Mark Hansson - associate director / stage manager
Marshall Katz - production secretary
John Pritchett - technical director
Mark Reilly - assistant: Sandy Chanley

Visuals and imagery
Glen Alex - hair stylist
Adam Christopher - makeup stylist
Damon Andres - audio: a2
Larry Reed - sound mixer
Blaine Stewart - post production audio
Marvin Bluth - tape operator
Randy Gomez - camera operator
Greg Grouwinkel - camera operator
Marc Hunter - camera operator
Ritch Kenney - camera operator
Simon Miles - lighting designer
Mark Sanford - video operator
Danny Webb - camera operator
Kris Wilson - camera operator
Judith Brewer Curtis - wardrobe stylist

References

External links
Kathy Griffin's Official Website

Kathy Griffin albums
Stand-up comedy albums
2006 live albums